Il pleut, il pleut, bergère (It's raining, it's raining, shepherdess) is a French song taken from the opéra comique in one act Laure et Pétrarque, written in 1780 by Fabre d'Églantine. The music was written by Louis-Victor Simon.

The shepherdess to whom the song refers is the French queen Marie Antoinette who loved to play the shepherdess in the Hameau de la reine of the Palace of Versailles. The rain and the storm coming could be an allusion to the troubles that led to the French Revolution.

It was sung for the creation of the National Guard after Bastille Day.  Some years later, d'Églantine hummed it on his way to the guillotine.

The first title of the song was Le Retour aux champs ("Back to the fields") before getting its current title in 1787.  It is also known as The Storm.

In the final of the first act of the opera Barbe-Bleue (1866), Jacques Offenbach plays the first notes of the song while Barbe-Bleue shows the shepherdess Boulotte as his next wife.

Edmond Rostand introduced this song at the end of his drama L'Aiglon (1900). It can be heard in the opera that Arthur Honegger and Jacques Ibert have drawn from this play in 1937.

References

 

French songs
Folk songs
Songs about weather
1780 songs